Almaty-2 is one of the oldest train stations located in Almaty, Kazakhstan. The station serves around average attendance of about 5000 people. During the summer however, the capacity of people increases to 10,000. Located in the center of the city, it serves as the primary departure point for passengers in all directions, including internationally, which are mostly Russian cities such as Moscow, St. Petersburg and Ürümqi in China. Domestic destinations are Astana, Shymkent, Petropavlovsk, Atyrau, Zhezkazgan, Mangyshlak, and Uralsk.

History
During the first years of building the station, the construction site of the building was located on the Turksib Krasnogvardeysky tract in place of the furniture factory. After the suggestion of the engineer, Mukhamedzhan Tynyshpaev, the construction was moved to the street, Starokladbischenskuyu (now named Abylai Khan), where the old cemetery was located. The cemetery was removed and was replaced with a station square which in later years saw tram and trolleybus services. The area opened a new path for a new avenue of the capital of Kazakh SSR. Railway Station Square has its own little history. In 1954, the monument to Abay was installed to the square. Then in 1972, a monument to Kalinin was added; it was removed in 1992. Finally in 2000, a monument to Abylai Khan was installed that is still standing. Around the square, an area of residential and public buildings were built. Until 1941, the train station and station facilities were built to a standard project. During the beginning of World War II, the east side of the building was built. The sides of the buildings are semi-circular projection in the facade in terms of volumes with large window panes located in the entrance part of the building. The sculptural composition of male and female figures, symbolizing the success, industry, agriculture and the Soviet Union. Decorative objects were made by a  Czech sculptor Bogomil Vahek exiled during Stalin years who lived in Almaty. All architects, engineers and designers of the station were eventually subsequently repressed and shot due to the effects of the Great Purge. In 1977, the building was reconstructed. With an addition construction of the west wing which included renovation of technology disorders, changing the interior and exterior of the building.

Gallery

See also

Almaty-1
Mukhamedzhan Tynyshpaev

References

Railway stations in Almaty Region
Buildings and structures in Almaty
Railway stations opened in 1939
Transport in Almaty